St Peter's Church, Leicester, is a Grade II listed parish church in the Church of England in the Highfields area of Leicester, Leicestershire.

History

The foundation stone was laid on 14 November 1872 by the Bishop of Peterborough. The church was built as a memorial to Richard Curzon-Howe, 1st Earl Howe, and was originally known as the Howe Memorial Church. It was built to the designs of the architect George Edmund Street.

The church was consecrated on 18 April 1874 by the Bishop of Peterborough.

The spire was dismantled in 1968 and the building continued to deteriorate such that by 2014 the tower masonry and roof coverings were in very poor condition, and the building was on the National Buildings at risk register.

Between 2018 and 2021, repairs funded by Heritage Lottery, the Leicester City Council, the Diocese of Leicester and the church's own funds, led to the tower, tower roof, stonework and the main roof being repaired.

Parish status
The church is in a benefice with St Philip's on Evington Road, Leicester.

Organ
The pipe organ was built by Joshua Porritt in 1875. It was extensively modified by Stephen Taylor and Son in 1910. A specification of the organ can be found on the National Pipe Organ Register.

Organists
William Henry Wale 1874 - 1882
Philip Angrave 1882 - 1891
Cardinal Taylor 1891 - 1894 (afterwards organist of St Mary's Church, Humberston)
Walter Joseph Bunney FRCO 1905 - 1936 (formerly organist of Holy Trinity Church, Leicester)
Harold Barnes 1937 - 1946  (afterwards organist of St Mary's Church, Melton Mowbray)

References

Leicester, St Peter
Grade II listed churches in Leicestershire
Churches completed in 1874
19th-century Church of England church buildings